Federation of Chatkal Mazdoor Unions, a trade union of jute mill workers in West Bengal, India. The union is affiliated to the All India Trade Union Congress. The general secretary of FCMU is Debasish Dutta.

Trade unions in India
Trade unions of the West Bengal jute mills
All India Trade Union Congress
Jute industry trade unions
Organizations with year of establishment missing